Abdul-Mumin Babalola (born 15 December 1984) is a Nigerian professional tennis player.

Born in Okene, Babalola is a left-hander who plays a serve and volley game. He has competed for the Nigeria Davis Cup team since 2002 and as of 2021 has featured in a record 49 ties. In 2002 he attained Nigeria's number one ranking for the first time and reached his best singles world ranking of 722 in 2007. He has won six ITF Futures doubles titles.

ITF Futures finals

Doubles: 9 (6–3)

References

External links
 
 
 

1984 births
Living people
Nigerian male tennis players
Sportspeople from Kogi State